Jimmie Lee Browner (born December 4, 1955) is a former American football defensive back in the National Football League (NFL) who played for the Cincinnati Bengals. He played college football at University of Notre Dame.

References 

Living people

Notre Dame Fighting Irish football players

1955 births
American football defensive backs
Cincinnati Bengals players